For the railroad engineer and architect (son of the bishop) see W. B. W. Howe, Jr.

William Bell White Howe (March 31, 1823 – November 25, 1894) was the sixth Bishop of South Carolina in the Episcopal Church.

Early life and education
Howe was born on March 31, 1823, in Claremont, New Hampshire, the son of the Reverend James Blake Howe and Mary White. He studied at the University of Vermont and graduated with a Bachelor of Arts in 1844. He was awarded a Doctor of Divinity from Sewanee: The University of the South in 1871 and a Doctor of Sacred Theology from Columbia College in 1872.

Ordained ministry
Howe was ordained deacon on April 9, 1847 and priest on June 4, 1849 by the Bishop of South Carolina Christopher Edwards Gadsden in Charleston, South Carolina, on both occasions. He served as rector of St John's Church in Berkley, South Carolina from 1848 till 1860. He married Catherine Gadsden Edwards on December 12, 1850. He then served as rector of St Philip's Church in Charleston, South Carolina between 1863 and 1871.

Bishop
On May 14, 1971, Howe was elected Coadjutor Bishop of South Carolina on October 8, 1871 in St Paul's Church, Baltimore by Presiding Bishop Benjamin B. Smith. He succeeded as diocesan bishop upon the death of Bishop Davis in December 2, 1871. He died in office in Charleston on November 25, 1894.

Family
Architect W. B. W. Howe, Jr. was his son.

See also

 List of Succession of Bishops for the Episcopal Church, USA

References

1824 births
1894 deaths
People from Claremont, New Hampshire
Episcopal bishops of South Carolina
19th-century American Episcopalians
19th-century American clergy